Daft Punk were a French electronic music duo that has received numerous awards and accolades. Their debut album Homework features the singles "Da Funk" and "Around the World", which led to Grammy Award nominations in 1998 and 1999 respectively for Best Dance Recording. In 2002, Daft Punk received nominations for the tracks "One More Time" and "Short Circuit" from their second studio album Discovery; the album as a whole was also nominated for a Brit Award that same year. The duo's third studio album Human After All was nominated for the Grammy Award for Best Dance/Electronica Album in 2007. Daft Punk would go on to win their first Grammys in 2009 for their live album Alive 2007 and its single "Harder, Better, Faster, Stronger (Alive 2007)", in the respective categories of Best Electronic/Dance Album and Best Dance Recording.

The duo's Tron: Legacy film soundtrack received an award for "Best Original Score" from the Austin Film Critics Association, was nominated for Score of the Year and Breakout Composer of the Year, and won Best Original Score for a Fantasy/Science Fiction/Horror Film by the International Film Music Critics Association. The soundtrack album was also nominated for Best Score Soundtrack Album for Visual Media at the 54th Grammy Awards. Daft Punk's fourth studio album Random Access Memories received Grammys for Album of the Year, Best Dance/Electronica Album and Best Engineered Album, Non-Classical for the 56th Annual Grammy Awards. The lead single "Get Lucky" also won for Record of the Year and Best Pop Duo/Group Performance. "Get Lucky" had previously been nominated for Best Song of the Summer at the 2013 MTV Video Music Awards and Best Song at the 2013 MTV Europe Music Awards. As a featured artist with The Weeknd, Daft Punk won two awards: Best Video for "Starboy" at the 2016 MTV Europe Music Awards, and Song of the Year for "I Feel It Coming" at the 2018 BMI R&B/Hip-Hop Awards.

American Music Awards
The American Music Awards are an annual awards show from the American Broadcasting Company held every year. Daft Punk received one nomination.

|-
| 2013 || Daft Punk || Favorite Electronic Dance Music Artist || 
|}

Austin Film Critics Association
The Austin Film Critics Association (AFCA) is an organization of professional film critics from Austin, Texas. Daft Punk received one nomination.

|-
| 2010 || Daft Punk (for Tron: Legacy) || Best Original Score || 
|}

Billboard Music Awards 

|-
| 2011 || Tron: Legacy || Top Dance Album || 
|-
| rowspan="4" | 2014 || Daft Punk || Top Dance/Electronic Artist || 
|-
| Random Access Memories || Top Dance/Electronic Album || 
|-
| rowspan="2" | "Get Lucky" (featuring Pharrell Williams) || Top Streaming Song (Audio) || 
|-
| Top Dance/Electronic Song || 
|-
| rowspan="5" | 2017 || rowspan="4" | "Starboy" || Top Collaboration || 
|-
| Top Streaming Song (Audio) || 
|-
| Top R&B Song || 
|-
| rowspan="2" | Top R&B Collaboration || 
|-
| "I Feel It Coming" || 
|}

Brit Awards
The Brit Awards are the British Phonographic Industry's annual pop music awards. Daft Punk has received five nominations; one of which resulted in an award.

|-
|rowspan="2"| 1998 ||rowspan="2"| Daft Punk || International Breakthrough Act || 
|-
| International Group || 
|-
|rowspan="2"| 2002 || Daft Punk || International Group || 
|-
| Discovery || International Album || 
|-
| 2014 || Daft Punk || International Group|| 
|}

BMI R&B/Hip-Hop Awards
The BMI Awards are Broadcast Music, Inc.'s annual music awards. Daft Punk was directly named for an award (as a featured artist).

|-
|rowspan="2"| 2018 ||rowspan="2"| "I Feel It Coming" (with The Weeknd) || Song of The Year || 
|}

DJ Magazine's Top 100 DJs
DJ Magazine's top 100 DJs list is an annual poll which fans ranks their favourite DJs based on their previous years work. Daft Punk has been in the top 40 on 5 different occasions.

GAFFA Awards

Denmark GAFFA Awards
Delivered since 1991, the GAFFA Awards are a Danish award that rewards popular music by the magazine of the same name.

!
|-
| 1997
| Daft Punk
| Foreign New Act
| 
| style="text-align:center;" |
|-
| rowspan="2"| 2013
| "Get Lucky" (with Pharrell Williams)
| Best Foreign Song
| 
| style="text-align:center;" rowspan="2"|
|-
| Daft Punk
| Best Foreign Band
| 
|}

Sweden GAFFA Awards
Delivered since 2010, the GAFFA Awards (Swedish: GAFFA Priset) are a Swedish award that rewards popular music awarded by the magazine of the same name.

!
|-
|rowspan="2"| 2013
| Daft Punk
| Best Foreign Band
| 
| style="text-align:center;" rowspan="2"|
|-
| "Get Lucky" (with Pharrell Williams)
| Best Foreign Song
| 
|-
|}

Grammy Awards
The Grammy Awards are awarded annually by the National Academy of Recording Arts and Sciences of the United States. Daft Punk has received thirteen nominations; seven of which resulted in awards.

|-
|  
| "Da Funk" 
| rowspan="3"|Best Dance Recording
| 
|-
|  
| "Around the World" 
| 
|-
| rowspan="2"|  
| "One More Time"
| 
|-
| "Short Circuit"
| Best Pop Instrumental Performance 
| 
|-
|  
| Human After All 
| rowspan="2"|Best Electronic/Dance Album 
| 
|-
|  rowspan="2"|  
| Alive 2007
| 
|-
| "Harder, Better, Faster, Stronger (Alive 2007)" 
| Best Dance Recording 
| 
|-
|  
| Tron: Legacy 
| Best Score Soundtrack for Visual Media 
| 
|-
|rowspan="5"|  
|rowspan=3|Random Access Memories 
| Album of the Year 
| 
|-
| Best Dance/Electronic Album 
| 
|-
| Best Engineered Album, Non-Classical
| 
|-
|rowspan="2"| "Get Lucky" 
| Record of the Year 
| 
|-
| Best Pop Duo/Group Performance 
| 
|-
| 
| Starboy (as producer and featured artist)
| Best Urban Contemporary Album
| 
|-
|}

International Dance Music Awards

The International Dance Music Award was established in 1985. It is a part of the Winter Music Conference, a weeklong electronic music event held annually. Daft Punk has won six awards from thirteen nominations.

 
|-
| rowspan="3" | 1998
| "Around the World"
| Best Dance Video
|  
|-
| rowspan="8" | Daft Punk
| Best New Dance Artist (Group)
|  
|-
| rowspan="4" | Best Dance Artist (Group)
|  
|-
| 2002
|   
|-
| 2006
|  
|-
| 2008
|  
|-
| 2009
| rowspan="3" | Best Artist (Group)
|  
|-
| 2011
|  
|-
| rowspan="5" | 2014
|  
|-
| Random Access Memories 
| Best Full Length Studio Recording
|  
|-
| rowspan="3" | "Get Lucky"
| Best Commercial / Pop Dance Track 
|  
|-
| Best Featured Vocalist Performance
|  
|-
| Best Music Video
|

Las Vegas Film Critics Society
The Las Vegas Film Critics Society (LVFCS) is a non-profit, progressive organization dedicated to the advancement and preservation of film and is composed of selected print, television, radio and internet film critics in the Las Vegas and Reno area. Daft Punk received one nomination.

|-
| 2010 || Daft Punk (for Tron: Legacy) || Best Original Score	 || 
|}

MTV Europe Music Awards
The MTV Europe Music Awards were created in 1994 by MTV Europe. Daft Punk has received nine nominations, one which resulted in an award (as a featured artist).

|-
|rowspan="2"| 1997 || "Around the World" || Best Video || 
|-
|rowspan="3"| Daft Punk || Best Dance || 
|-
|rowspan="3"| 2001 || Best Dance || 
|-
| French Act || 
|-
| www.daftpunk.com || Web Award || 
|-
|rowspan="3"| 2013 || "Get Lucky" (featuring Pharrell Williams) || Best Song ||  
|-
|rowspan="2"| Daft Punk || Best Electronic ||  
|-
|Best French Act || 
|-
|rowspan="1"| 2016 || "Starboy" (with The Weeknd) || Best Video || 
|}

MTV Video Music Awards
The MTV Video Music Awards were created in 1984 by MTV Networks to honor the best music videos of the year. Daft Punk received two nominations.

|-
|rowspan="2" | 1997
| "Da Funk"
| Breakthrough Video
| 
|-
| "Around the World"
| International Viewer's Choice—MTV Europe
| 
|-
| 2013
| "Get Lucky" (featuring Pharrell Williams)
| Best Song of the Summer
|
|}

MVPA Awards

|-
| 2006
| "Technologic"
| Best Electronic Video
|

NME Awards

!Ref.
|-
| 1998
| "Da Funk"
| Best Dance Single
| 
| 
|-
| 2002
| Daft Punk
| Best Dance Act
| 
|

Porin 

|-
| rowspan="2" | 2014 || "Get Lucky" (featuring Pharrell Williams) ||Best International Song || 
|-
| Random Access Memories || Best International Album || 
|}

Saturn Awards
The Saturn Award is an award presented annually by the Academy of Science Fiction, Fantasy & Horror Films to honor the top works mainly in science fiction, fantasy, and horror in film, television, and home video. Daft Punk received one nomination.

|-
| 2010 || Tron: Legacy || Best Music || 
|}

Teen Choice Awards
The Teen Choice Awards is an annual awards show created by Fox Broadcasting Company that honors film, television, music, sports, fashion, voted by teen viewers aged 13 to 19. Daft Punk received three nominations.

|-
|rowspan="3" | 2013 || rowspan="2"| "Get Lucky" || Choice Music: Single by a Group || 
|-
|Choice Summer: Song || 
|-
|rowspan="1"| Daft Punk || Choice Summer: Group || 
|}

NRJ Music Awards 
NRJ Music Awards in France

|-
| rowspan="2" | 2002 || Discovery || International album || 
|-
| Daft Punk || International group || 
|-
| 2014 || Daft Punk || French Group/Duo of the Year || 
|}

Victoires de la Musique

The Victoires de la Musique is an annual French award ceremony.

|-
| 2008 || Alive 2006/2007 || Musical / Tour / Concert ||

References

External links
 Official website
 Daft Punk at AllMusic
 
 

Awards
Lists of awards received by French musician
Lists of awards received by musical group